The Louisiana–Monroe Warhawks softball team represents the University of Louisiana at Monroe in NCAA Division I college softball. The team participates in the Sun Belt Conference. The Warhawks are currently led by head coach Molly Fichtner, who was hired in September 2018. The team plays its home games at the Geo-Surfaces Field at the ULM Softball Complex located on the university's campus.

Perfect games
The following perfect games have been thrown by Louisiana–Monroe pitchers over the program's history.

February 12, 2016. Paige Porter vs Grambling State (won 23–0, 5 innings)

Coaches

Year-by-year results

See also
List of NCAA Division I softball programs

References

External links